The Kearney Kapitalists were a Nebraska State League team based in Kearney, Nebraska, United States that played from 1910 to 1914. Major league baseball players that played for them include Jerry Akers, Win Noyes, Harry Berte, Rolla Mapel, Joe Lotz, Gus Bono and Dutch Wetzel. They were managed by Berte from at least 1912 to 1914.

References

Baseball teams established in 1910
Baseball teams disestablished in 1914
Defunct minor league baseball teams
Defunct baseball teams in Nebraska
1910 establishments in Nebraska
1914 disestablishments in Nebraska
Sports in the Tri-Cities, Nebraska
Nebraska State League teams